Oberottendorf is a former railway station in the village of Oberottendorf, Saxony, Germany. The station lies on the Bautzen–Bad Schandau railway.

References

External links
Photos of the station 

Railway stations in Saxony
Railway stations in Germany opened in 1877
Railway stations closed in 2005
Neustadt in Sachsen